Cătina is a commune in Cluj County, Transylvania, Romania. It is composed of six villages: Cătina, Copru (Kapor), Feldioara (Melegföldvár), Hagău (Hágótanya), Hodaie and Valea Caldă (Melegvölgyitanya).

Demographics
According to the 2002 census, Romanians made up 75.71% of the population, Hungarians made up 20.83% and Roma made up 3.40%.

Natives
Jenő Barcsay

Images

References

Communes in Cluj County
Localities in Transylvania